Turney Duff (born 1969) is an American businessman, author, and former trader. He is known for his book, The Buy Side.

Biography
Duff was born in Cleveland, Ohio and then moved to Kennebunk, Maine. He received his early education from the Kennebunk High School. He attended Ohio University, where he graduated in 1993 with a degree in journalism.

Duff began his career at Morgan Stanley in 1994, where he started off as a sales assistant in the Private Wealth group. 

In 1999, he joined the Galleon Group where he worked as a health care trader for two years.

In 2001, he co-founded a billion-dollar hedge fund called Argus Partners.

From 2007 to 2009, he worked for J.L. Berkowitz which he left in 2009 to pursue a writing career.

In 2013, he published a memoir, The Buy Side. The memoir became a bestseller and was included in The New York Times bestseller list. The memoir has been reviewed by multiple publications, including Publishers Weekly and Kirkus Reviews.

In 2014, Duff was featured on PBS's Frontline: To Catch a Trader.

He is a regular commentator on CNBC's prime time show The Filthy Rich Guide, and was a consultant for Showtime's series Billions.

Bibliography
 Duff, Turney (2013). The Buy Side

References

Living people
1969 births
American journalists
20th-century American writers
Ohio University alumni